Spaceman is a 2016 biographical film about former Major League Baseball pitcher Bill "Spaceman" Lee written and directed by Brett Rapkin and starring Josh Duhamel as  Lee.

Premise
Spaceman is the true story of former Major League Baseball pitcher Bill "Spaceman" Lee following his release from the Montreal Expos.

Cast
 Josh Duhamel as Bill "Spaceman" Lee
 Ernie Hudson as Joe
 W. Earl Brown as Dick Dennis
 Sterling K. Brown as Rodney Scott
 Peter Mackenzie as Tim Manning
 Emma Rose Maloney as Caitlin Lee
 Wallace Langham as Bruce Lindsay
 Wade Williams as Tom Fulton

References

External links

American baseball films
2016 films
Biographical films about sportspeople
Cultural depictions of baseball players
Cultural depictions of American men
2010s English-language films
2010s American films